"Careless Love" is a traditional song, with several popular blues versions. It has been called a "nineteenth-century ballad and Dixieland standard".

The death referenced in an old version was the son of a Kentucky governor. Although published accounts have cited 1926 as the copyright date, W. C. Handy copyrighted "Loveless Love" in 1921 under Pace & Handy Music Co.

A recording by Bessie Smith titled "Careless Love Blues" was very popular in 1925. The same year it was recorded by Papa Celestin and his Tuxedo Dixieland Jazz Band and released as a single by OKeh. New Orleans cornetist Chris Kelly was famous for his emotional rendition of the piece.

Many other artists have recorded "Careless Love" including Lonnie Johnson (musician), Eartha Kitt, Dr. John, Brook Benton, Connie Francis, Dinah Washington, Snooks Eaglin, Fats Domino, Frankie Laine, Madeleine Peyroux, Nat King Cole, Ray Charles, Rosemary Clooney, Shirley Bassey, Ronnie Lane, Slim Whitman and Van Morrison. Noh Sa-yeon released a Korean version of this song, "Nim Geurimja"(My Lover's Shadow) in 1983, which led to a few Korean singers covering that version.

See also
List of pre-1920 jazz standards

References

American folk songs
Blues songs
Jazz standards of obscure origin
1925 singles
Slim Whitman songs